Abro is a clan settled in Sindh and Balochistan.

Abro, ABRO or Åbro may also refer to:

 Abro, a 2015 Pakistani TV series
 Abro, original Teutonic Order Low German name given to the present Estonian island village of Abruka
 Åbro, a beer in Sweden
 ABRO Gallery by Ada Balcácer (2008–2012), an art gallery in Miami, Florida
 Animal Breeding Research Organisation (1947–1986), a research institute at the University of Edinburgh
 Army Base Repair Organisation (1993–2008), a British defence agency 
 Army of Burma Reserve Organisation (1885–1948), a colonial-era local population component of the British Burma Army

See also
Abra (disambiguation)